Tea Garden Express (Officially known as KaraikalErnakulam Express) is a overnight regional rail connecting Karaikal in Union Territory of Puducherry with Ernakulam in Kerala via Thanjavur Junction, Tiruchirappalli Junction,Karur Junction, Coimbatore Junction, Palakkad Junction.

History 

The train introduced during the 1940s, as Ooty–Cochin express to transport tea and related products from the Nilgiris to Cochin Port and further exported to Europe and world over, hence came the name of the train. In the 2009–2010 Railway Budget, it was announced that the service will be extended to Nagore, and the extension was effected on 30 March 2010. The number of train was changed from the 68656866 to 1686516866, since December 2010 onwards as a part of train management system over the entire Indian Railways network. The train services were further extended to Karaikal from 17 December 2011 onwards and re–numbered from 1686516866 to 1618716188, since 1 September 2013.

Importance 
This train provides connectivity for the people of Kerala and western districts to educational institutions and places of worship in delta districts, viz., Navagraha temples like Tirunallar Saniswaran Temple and Thyagaraja Temple, Tiruvarur others, Nagore Dargah and Velankanni Matha shrine.

Rakes
This train has 23 bogies composing all six classes: One AC 2–Tier (2A), Two AC 3–Tier (3A), Thirteen II Sleeper coaches (SL), five Unreserved (general) coaches (URGS) and two Luggage rakes (SLR).

Rake revesal will be done at TPJ.

Schedule 
The train numbered 16187 departs Karaikal railway station as Ernakulam Express at 16:30 hours, arrives Tiruchirappalli Junction at 19:50 hours, reverses loco and departs at 20:00 hours and finally arrives Ernakulam Junction at 07:00 hours, the next day. On the return direction, the train numbered 16188 departs Ernakulam Junction as Karaikal Express at 22:30 hours, arrives Tiruchirappalli Junction at 07:55 hours, the next day, reverses loco and departs at 08:05 hours and finally arrives Karaikal railway station at 11:55 hours. Some of the prominent stoppages for the train are Nagore, Nagapattinam, Thiruvarur, Thanjavur, Karur, Coimbatore, Palakkad, Shoranur, Thrissur and Aluva.

See also
 Chennai Egmore – Mangalore Central Express
 Guruvayur Express

Notes

References

External links 
 Southern Railway - Official Website

Transport in Karaikal
Transport in Kochi
Named passenger trains of India
Tea culture
Indian tea
Rail transport in Kerala
Rail transport in Tamil Nadu
Railway services introduced in 1944